Mandera West Constituency is an electoral constituency in Kenya that was established for the 1966 elections. It is one of six constituencies in Mandera County. It has five wards, all electing councillors to the Mandera County Assembly.

County Assembly wards in Mandera West Constituency
According to the 2009 census:

1. Takaba South Ward

County Assembly Ward No.: 0191
County Assembly Ward Name: Takaba south
County Assembly Ward Population (Approx.): 42,557
County Assembly Ward Area In Sq. km (Approx.): 1,725.20
County  Assembly Ward Description: Comprises Wangai Dahan, Duduble, Bolowle and Didkuro Sub–Locations of Mandera County
County Members of Assembly: Hon. Hussein Adan Haji (HAJI HUSKA) (2017-2022)

Personal details:
Hon.CPA.Hussein Adan Haji,
Born. 20 July 1989,
Mandera, Kenya.
Professional; HRM, ICPAK, finance, Accounts and Audit.
Highest Education level. PHD(UON) student.
Protectorate (Kenya).
Political party Economic Freedom Party(EFP).
Spouse(s)
Meymuna Kala,

2. Takaba Ward

County Assembly Ward No.: 0192
County Assembly Ward Name: Takaba
County Assembly Ward Population (Approx.): 33,542
County Assembly Ward Area In Sq. km (Approx.): 435.80
County  Assembly Ward Description: Comprises Takaba and Kubdishan Sub–Locations of Mandera County

3. Lagsure Ward

County Assembly Ward No.: 0193
County Assembly Ward Name: Lagsure
County Assembly Ward Population (Approx.): 14,837
County Assembly Ward Area In Sq. km (Approx.): 982.50
County  Assembly Ward Description: Comprises Lagsure Sub–Location of Mandera County

4. Dandu Ward

County Assembly Ward No.: 0194
County Assembly Ward Name: Dandu
County Assembly Ward Population (Approx.): 37,494
County Assembly Ward Area In Sq. km (Approx.): 791.80
County  Assembly Ward Description: comprises Dandu, El Danada Kubi Halo and Ilresteno Sub–Locations of Mandera County

5. Gither Ward

County Assembly Ward No.: 0195
County Assembly Ward Name: Gither
County Assembly Ward Population (Approx.): 33,271
County Assembly Ward Area In Sq. km (Approx.): 652.00
County  Assembly Ward Description: Comprises Gither and Sake Sub–Locations of Mandera County

Members of Parliament 
2022 Kenyan general election 2022 Adan Haji Yussuf United Democratic Movement (UDM)

Wards

References

External links 
Dujis Constituency Online (unofficial)

Constituencies in Mandera County
Constituencies in North Eastern Province (Kenya)
1966 establishments in Kenya
Constituencies established in 1966